Azov (Russian and ),  previously known as Dzerzhynske, is a village in Novoazovsk Raion of Donetsk Oblast of eastern Ukraine, The village is located 124 km SSE of Donetsk city center.

Azov was captured by Donetsk People's Republic forces during the War in Donbas.  

In 2016, the Ukrainian parliament approved renaming the village to Azov as part of decommunization. However, since the separatists with actual control of the village do not recognize this name change, this renaming has not yet gone into effect.

Demographics
The settlement had 209 inhabitants in 2001; native language distribution as of the Ukrainian Census of 2001:
Ukrainian: 59.33%
Russian: 40.67%

References

Villages in Kalmiuske Raion